Sacred Heart Academy is an all-girls preparatory school located on Cathedral Avenue, in Hempstead, New York, United States. It is private and Catholic.  Located within the Roman Catholic Diocese of Rockville Centre, it is run by the Sisters of Saint Joseph. Sacred Heart Academy is a single-sex school for girls, grades 9 to 12. The official school colors of Sacred Heart are red and gold.

History
Sacred Heart Academy was established in 1949 by the Sisters of St. Joseph of Brentwood.

Athletics
Sacred Heart Academy is a member of the Nassau Suffolk Catholic High School Girls Athletic League and participates in interscholastic volleyball, basketball, softball, soccer, lacrosse, track and field, cross country, swimming, golf and tennis.  Basketball, softball, soccer and lacrosse teams have all won state.

Activities
Students can participate in musical theatre, performances of The Nutcracker, band, orchestra, and two types of chorus, as well as dozens of clubs.

Notable alumnae
Katherine Lapp, 1974, Executive Vice President and Chief Administrative Officer of Harvard University
Alice McDermott, 1971, Author

Notes and references

External links
Sacred Heart Academy Hempstead official website

Educational institutions established in 1949
Hempstead (village), New York
Catholic secondary schools in New York (state)
Education in Nassau County, New York
Girls' schools in New York (state)
Roman Catholic Diocese of Rockville Centre
Sisters of Saint Joseph schools
1949 establishments in New York (state)